The Corridor I is one of the Pan-European corridors. It runs between Helsinki in Finland, and Warsaw and Gdańsk in Poland. The corridor follows the route: Helsinki - Tallinn - Riga - Warsaw/Gdańsk.

Branches
Branch A (Via Hanseatica) - St. Petersburg to Riga to Kaliningrad to Gdańsk to Lübeck
Branch B (Via Baltica/E67) - Helsinki to Warsaw.

See also
Rail Baltica

References

External links
Homepage of Via Hanseatica

01
Roads in Finland
Roads in Estonia
Roads in Lithuania
Roads in Latvia
Roads in Russia
Roads in Poland